Chalandri, also known as Halandri on signage, is a station on Athens Metro Line 3. It opened on 24 July 2004 and served as the original northern terminus for four days, until  opened. The eastbound platform has a mural by Rena Papaspirou, titled Images Through Matter (2010).

Station layout

References

Athens Metro stations
Transport in North Athens
Buildings and structures in North Athens
Chalandri
Railway stations opened in 2004
2004 establishments in Greece